The bhankora (plural: bhankore) is a type of made of copper that is prominently used in the folk music of Uttarakhand in India, especially in the Garhwal region. The instrument is aerophonic and used in religious Garhwal folk dramas, most notably the Pandav Lila and Nanda Devi Raj Jat. The instrument is played only by upper class Garhwalis during the Naubat, Dhanyal, and Dev Jatra types of religious ritual performances. The bhankora is made of copper and is about 36 inches long and about 3 inches in diameter; it creates a sweet melodious sound and tone.

Bhankora or bhonkara is Uttarakhand's native musical instrument. This is handmade in copper metal by local Tamta artisans of Uttarakhand traditionally. The size of Bhankora varies from region to region. However traditionally the ideal height of full sized bhankora is supposed to be from ground till the ears of a normal sized person. Bhankora an Aero Phonic or Wind Musical Instrument in Garhwali Folk Drama, Folk Rituals, Community ideas and Traditional Plays from Chamoli Garhwal, North India, South Asia

The full sized version of this instrument is played during ceremonial prayers at temples, and at the Pandav Lila, a ritual re-enactment of episodes from the Mahabharata in the Garhwal region.

References 

Indian musical instruments
Culture of Uttarakhand
Brass instruments
Folk music instruments
Trumpets